Médoc is an AOC for wine in the Bordeaux wine region of southwestern France, on the Left Bank of the Gironde estuary that covers the northern section of the viticultural strip along the Médoc peninsula. The zone is sometimes called Bas-Médoc, though this term is not permitted on any label. With few exceptions there is produced only red wine, and no white wine has the right to be called Médoc.

The term Médoc is often used in a geographical sense to refer to the whole Left Bank region, and as defined by the original Institut National des Appellations d'Origine (INAO) decree of November 14, 1936, the appellation may be applied to all wine produced in the prescribed zone in the peninsula, but this is rare practice by estates within Médoc's sub-appellations as it carries lesser perceived prestige. Effectively it covers the northern third of the Médoc peninsula, defined by a border that runs from Saint-Yzans and Saint-Germain-d'Esteuil (at the northern edges of Haut-Médoc AOC and Saint-Estèphe AOC) in the south, to Soulac-sur-Mer in the north, although viticultural activity ends near Vensac. In all sixteen wine-producing communes are exclusive to Médoc, and Bégadan, Saint-Christoly, Ordonnac, Saint-Yzans and Saint Germain d'Esteuil have historically enjoyed a reputation level to communes of the northern Haut-Médoc.

Predominantly an area of cooperatives today, none of the estates were included in the Bordeaux Wine Official Classification of 2024, although several have been included in the (eventually discontinued) classification Cru Bourgeois.

Overview
The area covers approximately 5,700 hectares of declared vineyards, constituting 34.5% of the Médoc total, annually producing on average 300,000 hectolitres of wine. 

The soils are Garonne gravel, Pyrenees gravel and clayey limestone with extreme variation in character. There are frequent areas of heavy, clay-rich, moisture-retentive soils better suited for cultivation of the Merlot grape than Cabernet Sauvignon, and vineyards are less densely packed than further south, intermingled with other forms of agriculture.

Of the grape varieties permitted by INAO in Médoc, 50% of the viticultural area is planted with Cabernet Sauvignon and Merlot, and to a lesser extent Petit Verdot and Malbec (locally called "Côt"). Also allowed within the AOC regulations are the varieties Cabernet Franc and Carménère.

The regulations also exclude viticultural activity in the communes Carcans, Hourtin, Brach, Saumos, Lacanau, Le Temple, Le Porge, and on "land of recent alluvium and sand lying on impermeable subsoils".

Estates
Of the 584 viticultural properties of Haut-Médoc, 239 are independent wineries and 345 are in winemaking cooperatives. Four out of five cooperatives belong to the group Unimédoc which ensures aging, bottling and marketing.

Notes and references

a.    Cru Bourgeois as a term of classification since 1932, was annulled in 2007, and reintroduced in 2009.

General

 Médoc Bordeaux.com, Le Conseil Interprofessionnel du Vin de Bordeaux (CIVB)
 Médoc AOC decree, INAO 

Footnotes

Bordeaux AOCs

cs:Médoc AOC